Lis Sørensen (born 28 May 1955) is a Danish pop singer.  In the 1970s she worked with Anne Linnet in Shit & Chanel and Anne Linnet Band. In 1983 she released her first solo album. She is also known for being the first artist to record Ednaswap's "Torn", which was renamed "Brændt" (Danish for "Burned"). The song was later made famous by Natalie Imbruglia and Trine Rein.

Lis Sørensen is the mother of Danish songwriter and music producer Sly.

Discography
Studio albums

Compilation albums

Live albums

Singles

Other discographies
In Shit & Chanel
Shit & Chanel (1976)
Chanel No. 5 (1977)
Tak for sidst (1978)
Dagen har så mange farver (1979)

In Anne Linnet Band
You're Crazy (1980)
Anne Linnet Band (1981)
Cha Cha Cha (1982)

In Cowgirls
Girls Night Out (2001)

References

External links
Official webpage

1955 births
Living people
20th-century Danish women singers
Danish pop singers
Singers from Aarhus